Ludovico de Lagoria, O.P. was a Roman Catholic prelate who served as Bishop of Lavello (1504–1515)
and Bishop of Cagli (1503–1504).

Biography
Ludovico de Lagoria was ordained a priest in the Order of Preachers.
On 8 March 1503, he was appointed during the papacy of Pope Alexander VI as Bishop of Cagli. 
On 13 February 1504, he was appointed during the papacy of Pope Julius II as Bishop of Lavello. 
He served as Bishop of Lavello until his resignation on 8 August 1515.

References

External links and additional sources
 (Chronology of Bishops) 
 (Chronology of Bishops) 
 (Chronology of Bishops) 
 (Chronology of Bishops) 

16th-century Italian Roman Catholic bishops
Bishops appointed by Pope Alexander VI
Bishops appointed by Pope Julius II
Dominican bishops